is a Japanese professional swimmer who specializes in individual medley, butterfly, breaststroke, and freestyle events. He holds the world record in the short course 400-metre individual medley and formerly held the world record in the short course 200-metre butterfly. He won the gold medal in the 400-metre individual medley at the 2012, 2014, 2016, 2018, 2021, and 2022 world short course championships, as well as at the 2013, 2015, and 2019 world long course championships.

Swimming career
Seto took up swimming at the age of five. He narrowly missed the 2012 Japan Olympic Team when he finished third in both the 200-metre and 400-metre individual medley events at the national selection meet. He improved his times at the 2012 FINA Swimming World Cup, where he competed at all stops of the World Cup circuit and achieved a fourth-place finish across all stops. He concluded the year's short course season at the 2012 World Short Course Championships. Here Seto won the first international medals of his career. He first competed in the 400-metre individual medley, where he won his first world title in a new Asian record of 3:59.12, over a second and a half faster than second-place finisher László Cseh. He then competed in the 200-metre individual medley, where he was able to sprint past Cseh for the silver medal in a time of 1:52.80.

2013 World Championships
Seto was still coming into the 2013 World Aquatics Championships in Barcelona, Spain, relatively unknown. He swam both individual medley events. In the 200-metre, his first event, he swam a personal best in the semifinals with a time of 1:58.03, and then finished a touch slower in the final the next night to finish seventh overall. In his best event of the Championships, the 400-metre individual medley, Seto qualified first for the final and then won his first long course world title by finishing first in a time of 4:08.69, about half a second ahead of second-place finisher Chase Kalisz of the United States. Seto became the second-fastest Asian performer in the event, behind Hagino, with his time.

2014 Pan Pacific Championships
During the 2014 Pan Pacific Swimming Championships Seto won a gold medal.

2015 World Championships
Seto successfully defended his world title in the 400-metre individual medley on the last day of the 2015 World Aquatics Championships in Kazan, Russia. Earlier in the meet, he did not live up to the expectations of others in the 200-metre butterfly and 200-metre individual medley, events in which he was ranked second in the world before leading up to the Championships.

2016 Summer Olympics

Seto earned a bronze medal in the 400-metre individual medley on 6 August, with a time of 4:09.71 in the final of the event at the 2016 Summer Olympics in Rio de Janeiro, Brazil. He also finished fifth in the 200-metre butterfly.

2018 Pan Pacific Championships
In 2018 he won a gold medal at the 2018 Pan Pacific Swimming Championships.

2018 World Short Course Championships
At the 2018 World Swimming Championships conducted in short course metres in Hangzhou, China in December, Seto won the gold medal in the 200-metre butterfly with a time of 1:48.24 that set a new world record in the event.

Seto was named "Male Asian Swimmer of the Year" by SwimSwam for the 2018 year.

2019 International Swimming League
In the autumn of 2019, he was a member of the inaugural season of the International Swimming League, swimming for the Energy Standard Swim Club. His club won the team title in Las Vegas, United States, in December. At the final match in Las Vegas, Seto set a new world record in the 400-metre individual medley with a time of 3:54.81, breaking the former record set by Ryan Lochte of the United States. Also in Las Vegas, he won the 200-metre butterfly over teammate Chad le Clos of South Africa, and the 200-metre individual medley.

2020 FINA Champions Swim Series
At the Beijing, China stop of the 2020 FINA Champions Swim Series in January, Seto set a new Asian record and Japan national record in the long course 200-metre butterfly with a time of 1:52.53, which put him only behind the world record holder in the event, Kristóf Milák of Hungary, and a former world record holder in the event, Michael Phelps of the United States, in terms of global rankings up to that point in time.

2020 Summer Olympics

He competed in his second Olympic Games at the 2020 Summer Olympics in Tokyo, Japan. He finished in fourth place in the 200-metre individual medley final, and did not qualify for 400-metre individual medley final.

2021 FINA Swimming World Cup
At the 2021 FINA Swimming World Cup stop in Doha, Qatar, Seto won the highest-scoring overall male award and prize money for the stop with his gold medal wins in the 200-metre breaststroke and 400-metre individual medley on the third and final day of competition in Doha contributing to his overall high score. The same day Seto was announced overall male winner for the Doha stop, SwimSwam revealed he had officially become a professional swimmer.

Stop 4: Kazan

On the first day of competition, 28 October, at the fourth and final stop of the World Cup circuit, held in the Palace of Water Sports in Kazan, Russia, Seto set new Asian and Japanese records in the 100-metre individual medley with a time 51.29 seconds. His swim in the final improved upon his time of 51.64 seconds from the morning prelims heats. The next day, Seto swam a 1:54.03 in the prelims heats of the 200-metre individual medley, ranking first by over one full second ahead of the next fastest competitor for the heats, Matthew Sates of South Africa who swam a 1:55.37. In the final, Seto finished first and won the gold medal with a World Cup record and personal best time of 1:50.66. Seto snuck into the final of the 200-metre breaststroke on the last day of competition of the 2021 World Cup circuit, ranking fifth overall with a time of 2:05.83 in the prelims heats. In the evening finals session, he started off by winning the gold medal in the 400-metre individual medley with a time of 3:57.85. For the 200-metre breaststroke final, Seto won the gold medal with a time of 2:01.49. His swims for the Kazan stop earned him 58.9 points, which was the highest total score by any competitor for a single stop of the World Cup circuit with the next highest scoring competitors being female swimmers Emma McKeon of Australia, who earned 58.3 points at two stops, and Kira Toussaint of the Netherlands, who earned 58.3 points at one stop. He also ranked ninth for total number of medals won by a male competitor across the circuit, winning only gold medals, that is all eight of his medals were gold medals. The moment when Seto set a new World Cup record in the 200-metre individual medley was ranked as the number seven moment from the 2021 Swimming World Cup by FINA.

2021 World Short Course Championships

In December 2021, Seto was announced as one of two swimmers from Japan to represent the country in competition at the 2021 World Short Course Championships in Abu Dhabi, United Arab Emirates. Starting his competition with the 200-metre individual medley on day one, he qualified for the final ranking first with a time of 1:52.38. In the evening final, he won the gold medal with a time of 1:51.15, finishing two-tenths of a second ahead of silver medalist Carson Foster of the United States. The third day of competition, he ranked first in the prelims heats of the 100-metre individual medley, qualifying for the semifinals with his time of 51.52 seconds. In the semifinals, he qualified for the final ranking third behind Kliment Kolesnikov of Russia and Tomoe Hvas of Norway with a time of 51.52 seconds. Seto placed fourth in the final, finishing six-hundredths of a second behind bronze medalist Thomas Ceccon of Italy with a time of 51.46 seconds. Day five of competition, he ranked first in the prelims heats of the 400-metre individual medley, qualifying for the final over one second faster than second-ranked Carson Foster with a time of 4:00.84. In the final in the evening, he won the gold medal with a time of 3:56.26.

2022 World Short Course Championships

At the 2022 World Short Course Championships, at Melbourne Sports and Aquatic Centre in Melbourne, Australia in December, Seto started off with a fifth-place finish in the 200-metre individual medley on day one with a time of 1:51.39. Two days later, he won the silver medal in the final of the 200-metre butterfly, finishing 0.95 seconds behind gold medalist Chad le Clos in a time of 1:49.22. On the fourth day, he competed in the 200-metre breaststroke for the first time at a World Short Course Championships, winning the gold medal with an Asian record time of 2:00.35, which was over one full second faster than silver medalist Nic Fink of the United States. The following day, he won a sixth-consecutive gold medal and world title in the final of the 400-metre individual medley, finishing in a time of 3:55.75, which was 1.88 seconds faster than second-place finisher Carson Foster and 3.46 seconds faster than third-place finisher Matthew Sates. It marked the first time at the World Short Course Championships that a swimmer won six-consecutive gold medals in any one event.

International championships (50 m)

 Seto swam only in the preliminaries.

International championships (25 m)

Career best times

Long course metres (50 m pool)

Short course metres (25 m pool)

World records

Short course metres

Continental and national records

Long course metres

Short course metres

Awards and honours
 FINA Top 10 Moments: 2021 Swimming World Cup (#7)
 SwimSwam Top 100 (Men's): 2021 (#4), 2022 (#6)
 SwimSwam Swammy Award, Asian Swimmer of the Year (male): 2018, 2019

Personal life
Daiya Seto is married to Yuka Mabuchi and has a daughter named Yuwa.

In September 2020, it was reported by The Japan Times, Yahoo!, and The Washington Post that Seto was involved in an extramarital affair. Seto apologised and resigned from his position as captain of the Japan Olympic Swim Team.

See also
 List of World Aquatics Championships medalists in swimming (men)
 List of World Swimming Championships (25 m) medalists (men)

References

External links

1994 births
Living people
Japanese male breaststroke swimmers
Japanese male butterfly swimmers
Japanese male freestyle swimmers
Japanese male medley swimmers
Medalists at the FINA World Swimming Championships (25 m)
Asian Games medalists in swimming
Swimmers at the 2014 Asian Games
Swimmers at the 2018 Asian Games
World Aquatics Championships medalists in swimming
Asian Games gold medalists for Japan
Sportspeople from Saitama Prefecture
Medalists at the 2016 Summer Olympics
Olympic bronze medalists for Japan
Olympic swimmers of Japan
Olympic bronze medalists in swimming
Swimmers at the 2016 Summer Olympics
Swimmers at the 2020 Summer Olympics
Medalists at the 2014 Asian Games
Medalists at the 2018 Asian Games
Universiade medalists in swimming
Asian Games bronze medalists for Japan
Universiade gold medalists for Japan
Universiade silver medalists for Japan
World record holders in swimming
Medalists at the 2017 Summer Universiade
21st-century Japanese people